Irene Smith may refer to:

Irene Smith, character in Whatever Happened to Harold Smith?
Irene Smith (publisher), co-founder of New Writers Press
Irene Smith (politician), see Socialist Party of Washington
Irene Britton Smith (1907–1999), American composer

See also
Rene Smith (disambiguation)